G-funk, short for gangsta funk, (or funk rap) is a sub-genre of gangsta rap that emerged from the West Coast scene in the late 1980s. The genre is heavily influenced by 1970s psychedelic funk (P-funk) sound of artists such as Parliament-Funkadelic.

Characteristics
G-funk (which uses funk with an artificially altered tempo) incorporates multi-layered and melodic synthesizers, slow hypnotic grooves, a deep bass, heavy use of the snare drum, background female vocals, the  extensive sampling of P-Funk tunes, and a high-pitched portamento saw wave synthesizer lead. It is typically set at a tempo of anywhere between 80 to 100 BPM.

The lyrical content depended on the artist and could consist of sex, drug use (especially marijuana), love for a city/neighborhood, love for friends and relaxing words. There was also a slurred "lazy" or "smooth" way of rapping in order to clarify words and stay in rhythmic cadence.

The trademark West Coast G-funk style of hip-hop was a very defining element of the region's music and helped distinguish it from the rivaling rap scene on the East Coast. In essence,  the smooth, slow-tempo sound of G-funk accompanied the perceived "laid-back" stereotype of Californian culture whereas East Coast hip-hop typically featured more aggressive attitudes alongside a fast-paced tempo (e.g. hardcore hip hop).

Unlike other earlier rap acts that also utilized funk samples (such as EPMD and the Bomb Squad), G-funk often utilized fewer, unaltered samples per song. Music theorist Adam Krims has described G-funk as "a style of generally West Coast rap whose musical tracks tend to deploy live instrumentation, heavy on bass and keyboards, with minimal (sometimes no) sampling and often highly conventional harmonic progressions and harmonies". Dr. Dre, a pioneer of the G-funk genre, normally uses live musicians to replay the original music of sampled records. This enabled him to produce music that had his own sounds, rather than a direct copy of the sample.

Although G-funk originated in Los Angeles, the subgenre drew a large amount of influence from the earlier Bay Area-based sound known as Mobb music of the mid-to-late 1980s, pioneered by rappers like Too Short and E-40. Too Short had experimented with looping sounds from classic P-Funk records over bass-heavy tracks during this period. However, unlike Bay Area Mobb music, Southern California-born G-funk used more portamento synthesizers and less live instrumentation. Too Short's lazy, drawl-heavy delivery was also a major influence on later G-funk rappers like Snoop Dogg.

History and origins

Beginnings
Early examples of the genre began to show up in 1989 with The D.O.C.'s "It's Funky Enough" and "The Formula", the former was an early minor hit for the genre, reaching No. 12 on the Hot R&B/Hip-Hop Songs chart. Two years later, in 1991, N.W.A. released another early example of the genre with their album Niggaz4Life, which reached No. 1 on the Billboard 200, and No. 2 on Billboards Top R&B/Hip-Hop Albums. The same year, Ice Cube's diss track towards N.W.A., "No Vaseline", was made in the style. Dr. Dre, who produced No One Can Do It Better and Niggaz4Life, is often seen as the originator/creator of the G-funk sound.

Mainstream
1992 was the breakout year for the genre, with Dr. Dre dropping his album The Chronic. The album was a massive success, having three top 40 singles: "Nuthin' but a 'G' Thang", the Eazy-E diss "Dre Day", and "Let Me Ride." It also reached No. 3 on the Billboard 200, and No. 1 on the Top R&B/Hip-Hop Albums chart. The album was eventually certified Triple Platinum by the RIAA in 1993 for selling three-million copies, it has also been selected by the Library of Congress for preservation in the National Recording Registry for being "culturally, historically, or aesthetically significant". Though G-funk had previously existed, Dr. Dre's The Chronic is often seen as the beginning of the genre. 

The following year had numerous successful songs and albums, Ice Cube's songs "It Was a Good Day" and "Check Yo Self" both made it to the top 20, peaking at No. 15 and No. 20 respectively, and were both certified at least gold.  "It Was a Good Day" is commonly placed high on best of lists for the genre, being considered "one of the best G-Funk tracks ever made". Snoop Dogg released his first album Doggystyle, which debuted at No. 1 on the Billboard 200, and contained the hits "Gin and Juice" and "What's My Name?", both songs reached No. 8 on the Hot 100. The album was certified Quadruple Platinum, and both singles were certified gold. Eazy-E released the G-funk-influenced album It's On (Dr. Dre) 187um Killa, which reached No. 5 on the Billboard 200, and contained the No. 42 hit "Real Muthaphuckkin G's", which was made as a response to Dre's song "Dre Day" from the previous year.

The genre's popularity grew even bigger in 1994, especially because of Warren G's song "Regulate", which was featured on the Above The Rim soundtrack. The single reached the top 10 peaking at No. 2. His album Regulate... G Funk Era which also contained the song, and another top 10 hit "This D.J.", reached No. 2 on the Billboard 200. Popular rapper MC Hammer went for a more gangsta image and G-funk sound on his album The Funky Headhunter, which contained the No. 26 single "Pumps and a Bump". The G-funk group Thug Life, featuring 2Pac released their first and only album, Thug Life: Volume 1,  it peaked at No. 42 on the Billboard 200, it had one minor hit single with "Cradle to the Grave", it charted on the Hot R&B/Hip-Hop Songs and on the Hot Rap Songs charts, at No. 91 on the former and No. 25 on the latter. Westcoast rapper Coolio released his debut album It Takes a Thief in 1994. The album peaked at No. 8, it contains the Top-10 hit "Fantastic Voyage".

In 1995, 2Pac released the album Me Against the World which although not entirely G-funk, has been described as having "half the record [resound] to the boom and bap of New York" while having "the rest [shimmer] in a G-funk haze". The album reached No. 1 on the Billboard 200, and was certified Double Platinum. Later in the year, he released the G-funk classic "California Love" which as a double A-side with "How Do U Want It", hit No. 1 on the Hot 100. In October 1995,  Tha Dogg Pound released their debut album Dogg Food and it debuted at number 1# on the billboard, continuing G-funk's dominance in the main stream with the top 50 singles "New York, New York" and "Let's Play House".

In 1996, the super-group Westside Connection released Bow Down. It had two hit singles, "Bow Down" and "Gangstas Make the World Go Round", which peaked at No. 21 and No. 40, respectively. The album itself peaked at No. 2 on the Billboard 200, and was certified Platinum by the RIAA in 1997. 2Pac released his album All Eyez on Me, which has been described as "lush G-funk" and as having a "commercial G-funk sheen". The album hit No. 1.

Warren G released his second album, Take a Look Over Your Shoulder, which peaked at No. 11 on the Billboard 200, it had two Top-40 singles, a cover of "I Shot the Sheriff" and "Smokin' Me Out".

Outside California
Although the majority of G-funk music has come out of California, the overall sound has been utilized by additional US rappers and hip-hop groups that were based in other states across the U.S. during the time of the style's popularity in the 1990s. Some of the most notable of these artists include Outkast (Georgia), G-Slimm (Louisiana), Bone Thugs-n-Harmony (Ohio), Tela (Tennessee), Top Authority (Michigan), E.S.G. (Texas), and DMG (Minnesota).

Southern G-funk
In the 1990s, Houston, Texas had a small, but noteworthy g-funk scene at the peak of the genre's popularity with artists such as the Geto Boys, Blac Monks, E.S.G., 5th Ward Boyz, Street Military, Big Mello, Scarface, Ganksta N-I-P, Bushwick Bill, Big 50, 5th Ward Juvenilez, and South Circle.

Post-1990s
In the 2000s, G-funk music significantly declined in mainstream popularity.

In 2001 Warren G released his fourth studio album, The Return of the Regulator, The album can be considered a return to the roots of G-funk west coast gangsta music, but it sold less than the rapper's two previous albums.

Midwestern rapper Tech N9ne made use of the G-funk style of rap music onto his early releases - most notably on his second studio album, The Worst (released in 2000). His subsequent 2001 follow-up album, Anghellic incorporated the subgenre's characteristics to a much lesser extent.

Most recently - into the 2010s and onward - many contemporary West Coast rappers have released albums which contain strong G-funk influences, including Kendrick Lamar with Good Kid, M.A.A.D City as well as To Pimp a Butterfly, YG with Still Brazy, Schoolboy Q with Blank Face LP, Nipsey Hussle with Victory Lap, Buddy with Harlan & Alondra and Tech N9ne with The Gates Mixed Plate. G-funk also has had somewhat of an impact on the development of modern Christian hip hop/Gospel rap. For example, many of the albums by the Christian recording artists Gospel Gangstaz, who have also enjoyed relatively mainstream success in the past, have exhibited token G-funk musical elements.

See also
 Gangsta rap
 Golden age hip hop
 List of G-funk artists and producers

References

 
1990s in music
American hip hop genres
Funk genres
Music of Los Angeles
Music of the San Francisco Bay Area
West Coast hip hop
1990s neologisms